Richard O'Connor (1889–1981) was a British Army Officer.

Richard O'Connor may also refer to:
Richard Alphonsus O'Connor (1838–1913), Canadian priest
Sixtus O'Connor (Richard James O'Connor) (1909–1983), American priest
Richard Edward O'Connor (1851–1912), Australian politician and judge
Richard Alfred O'Connor (1880–1941), South Australian politician
 Dick O'Connor (rugby league) (1916–1958), Australian rugby league footballer

See also
Richard Connor (born 1934), American diver